Haemorrhage is a Spanish goregrind band from Madrid.

History
The band formed in 1990 as Devourment and began its life as a trio, with Jose on bass and vocals, Luisma on guitar, and Emilio on drums, though this only lasted until the summer of 1991, when Emilio left the band. The group soon reformed, this time as duo, with Luisma again playing the role of guitarist and Jose taking over as drummer, with both performing vocals, and released their first demo as Haemorrhage: Grotesque Embryopathology. Near the end of 1993, Lugubrious and Ramon joined the band as vocalist and bassist, respectively. Between 1994 and 1995, Haemorrhage recorded a seven song promo tape, which was sent to Morbid Records and resulted in a two-album contract, welcomed guitarist Ana, and recorded their first release, Emetic Cult. However, Jose left in the following year due to personal issues and was replaced by Rojas. After releasing five studio albums on Morbid Records the band signed to Relapse Records which put out their albums Hospital Carnage and We are the Gore.

Influences and live shows

Haemorrhage are, like many goregrind bands, heavily influenced by Carcass, yet still have an identity all their own. 

Live shows typically feature band members sporting surgeon's outfits and vocalist Lugubrious covered in blood, which is common in the goregrind scene. Artwork is almost exclusively done by guitarist Luisma.

Current members
Luisma - guitar, vocals (1990–)
Lugubrious - vocals (1993–)
Ana - guitar (1994–)
Ramon - bass, vocals (1994–)
Osckar Bravo - drums (2019–)

Former members
Jose - bass, vocals (1990–1991) drums (1991–1996, 2011–2014, 2019)
Emilio - drums (1990–1991)
Rojas - drums (1996–2011)
David - drums (2014-2016)
Erik Raya - drums (2016-2019)

Discography

Studio albums
Emetic Cult (1995)
Grume (1997)
Anatomical Inferno (1998)
Morgue Sweet Home (2002)
Apology for Pathology (2006)
Hospital Carnage (2011)
We Are the Gore (2017)

Demos, singles and EPs
Grotesque Embryopathology Demo (1992)
Obnoxious Split with Christ Denied (1994)
Split with Exhumed (1995)
Split with Damnable (1996)
Grind Over Europe ’96 Split with Clotted Symmetric Sexual Organ/Dead Infection (1996)
The Cadaverous Carnival Split with Denak (1998)
Surgery for the Dead Split with Groinchurn (1998)
Split with Ingrowing (1999)
Rotten to the Gore Split with Embolism/Suffocate/Obliterate (2000)
Scalpel, Scissors, and Other Forensic Instruments (2000)
Loathesongs (2000)
Do You Still Believe in Hell? Split with Gonkulator (2001)
Dawn in the Rotting Czech Split with Mastic Scum (2001)
Live in the Morgue Split with Depression (2001)
Split with WTN (2002)
Dementia Rex split with Impaled (2003)
Live to Dissect Split with Terrorism (2004)
Feasting on Purulence Split with Nunslaughter (2005)
Furtive Dissection split with Embalming Theatre (2006)
Chainsaw Necrotomy split with Dead (2008)
In Gore we trust split with Dead Infection (2009)
Morgue Metal split with Disgorge (2011)
Hospital Thieves" split with Gruesome Stuff Relish (2011)
Punk Carnage EP (2012)
Feasting on Maryland (2013)
Obnoxious EP (2014)
To Serve - To Protect... To Kill - To Dissect / Great Grinds Drink Alike Split with Rompeprop (2016)
Fallen In Gore Split with Hemdale and Meat Spreader (2018)

External links
 Official Haemorrhage website
 Official Haemorrhage Myspace profile
 Haemorrhage Interview at Diabolical Conquest Webzine
 Morbid Records
 Haemorrhage endorser presentation by a german instrument builder 

Goregrind musical groups
Musical quintets
Spanish death metal musical groups
Spanish heavy metal musical groups
Musical groups established in 1990